Sir Stuart Saunders Hogg CIE (17 February 1833 – 23 March 1921) was a British civil servant in the Indian Civil Services of British India. He was born in 1833 in Delhi to Sir James Hogg, formerly a director of the British East India Company and the Registrar of the Calcutta High Court. In 1853, at the age of twenty, Stuart Hogg entered the Indian Civil Services. During the Sepoy Mutiny, he was posted in the Punjab. Later, he joined the Bengal government as the Police Commissioner of Calcutta where he established the Detective Department. From 1863 to 1877 he was the Chairman of the Calcutta Municipal Corporation. In 1875, he was knighted.

The New Market, Calcutta, an upscale market that he founded, was named Sir Stuart Hogg Market in 1903 in his honour. It is still (often) referred to as Hogg Market.

References

Biography 

Police officers from Kolkata
British police officers in India
Indian police chiefs
1833 births
1921 deaths
Indian justices of the peace
Companions of the Order of the Indian Empire